The 30th Prince Konstanty Ostrogski Mechanized Brigade is a formation of the Ukrainian Ground Forces. The full name of the unit is 30th Independent Mechanized Brigade "Konstanty Ostrogski".

Following the 2014 war in Donbas, the unit dropped all its Soviet decorations.

History

World War II 
Between September 1 and October 1, 1941, the 83rd Cavalry Division was formed in the city of Samarkand, Uzbekistan.

The division consisted of the following units:
 215th Cavalry Regiment
 226th Cavalry Regiment
 231st Cavalry Regiment
 Separate Chemical Squadron

From September 5, 1941, the commanding officer of the division was Lieutenant General Selivanov.

On November 7, 1941, the division was sent to the Volga Military District where it was assigned to the newly forming Cavalry mechanized group of the 61st Army. Until December 28, 1941, the division was fortifying near the station of Lysi Gory Saratov Oblast.

The first battle that the division took part in was near the city of Ryazhsk, Ryazan Oblast as part of the Cavalry mechanized group of the 61st Army as part of the Bryansk Front and the Soviet winter counter offensive in front of Moscow. In January 1942 the division was assigned to the 7th Cavalry Corps and was assigned to be a Mobile Group in the Moscow Defense Zone for the 61st Army. The division remained with the 7th Cavalry Corps for the rest of 1942 and when the Corps was redesignated as the 6th Guards Cavalry Corps in January 1943 the division became  the 13th Guards Cavalry Division on 19 January 1943. The division was under the command of General Major Pyotr Zubov.

The 13th Guards Cavalry Division fought at Dubno in 1944, as well as at the Battle of Debrecen and was with 6th Guards Cavalry Corps of the 2nd Ukrainian Front in May 1945.

Cold War 
Feskov et al. trace the unit's history as follows. At the beginning of June, the division relocated to Novohrad-Volynskyi. On 1 August 1945, the division was converted into the 11th Guards Mechanized Division. During November and December 1956, the division fought in the crushing of the Hungarian Revolution of 1956. 44 soldiers of the division were killed during the campaign in Hungary. The division moved back to Novohrad-Volynskyi in January 1957.

On 4 June 1957 it became the 30th Guards Tank Division, part of the 8th Tank Army. In 1960, the division's 58th Separate Tank Training Battalion was disbanded. On 19 February 1962 the 335th Separate Missile Battalion and the 108th Separate Equipment Maintenance and Recovery Battalion were activated. In 1968 the 151st Separate Guards Sapper Battalion became the 151st Separate Guards Engineer-Sapper Battalion. The 1043rd Separate Material Supply Battalion was created from the motor transport battalion in 1980. During the Cold War, the division was maintained at 25% strength. In November 1990, the division was equipped with 224 T-72 main battle tanks.

1990–present 
The 30th Guards Tank Division, along with the rest of the 8th Tank Army and the Carpathian Military District, became part of the Ukrainian Ground Forces according to the order of Ukraine About Armed Forces of Ukraine from December 6, 1991. In February 1992, all units of the division pledged their allegiance to Ukraine.

It was still designated a tank division as of Decree N 350/93 (August 21, 1993). On October 20, 1999, the division was awarded the Novohrad-Volynskyi designation. On July 30, 2004, the division was reformed into a brigade.

Currently the brigade is the only mechanized brigade that does not have any conscripts. It is also a part of Joint Rapid Reaction Forces. Over a hundred soldiers from the brigade have served in peacekeeping missions in Sierra Leone, Lebanon, Iraq and Kosovo.

A battalion of the brigade was part of POLUKRBAT in the 2006 rotation. As of October 12, 2007, the 2nd Mechanized Battalion of the brigade is deployed in Kosovo as part of the POLUKRBAT.

The commander of the brigade served as a commander of the 5th Separate Mechanized brigade in Iraq.

War in Ukraine

War in Donbas 
In the spring of 2014, after the annexation of Crimea to Russia, the 30th mechanized brigade, one of the five brigades of the armed forces of Ukraine, which was manned at that time by contract soldiers and was sent to the south, including to the Berdiansk region, to protect against a possible invasion from Crimea.

Participated in the armed conflict in the east of Ukraine. In the summer of 2014, the brigade took part in the battles for Saur-Mogila.

In 2015 the brigade took part in the Battle of Debaltseve during the war in Donbas.

On 18 November 2015 the Soviet decorations of brigade's full name (30th Separate Guards Mechanized Novohrad-Volynskyi Rivne Orders of the Red Banner and Suvorov Brigade) were removed, leaving the full name of 30th Separate Guards Mechanized Novohrad-Volynskyi Rivne Brigade. On 22 August 2016, its Guards title was also removed.

As part of Ukrainian Independence Day celebrations on August 24, 2018, the brigade received the new honorific "Konstanty Ostrogski".

As of 1 March 2020, the brigade had lost 178 people during the war in Donbas.

2022 Russian invasion of Ukraine 
In the 2022 Russian invasion of Ukraine, the 30th Mechanized Brigade participated in the 2022 Chornobaivka attacks against Russian positions through mortar strikes.

From May 5-13th tanks from the 30th Mechanized Brigade repelled a river crossing by the Russian 74th Separate Guards Motor Rifle Brigade near Dronivka. This action was part of the wider Battle of the Siverskyi Donets that saw the destruction of 80 pieces of equipment and of the estimated 550 Russian servicemembers conducting the operation, 485 were casualties. The battle is considered one of the "deadliest single engagements" of the war at that point.

By October 2022, the brigade was seen participating in operations during the Battle of Bakhmut.

Gallery

Order of battle 
In 1960, the division included the following units.
 276th Tank Regiment
 282nd Guards Tank Regiment
 325th Tank Regiment
 319th Guards Motor Rifle Regiment (Vysokaya Rech, Zhitomir Oblast)
 855th Guards Artillery Regiment
 937th Guards Anti-Aircraft Artillery Regiment
 54th Guards Reconnaissance Battalion
 151st Guards Sapper Battalion
 214th Guards Communications Battalion
 197th Chemical Defence Company (Vysokaya Rech, Zhitomir Oblast)
 112th Medical-Sanitary Company
 Motor Transport Battalion

Division: 2003 
 276th Armor Regiment
 325th Armor Regiment
 282nd Guards Armor Regiment
 319th Mechanized Regiment
 855th Guards Artillery Regiment
 937th Anti-Aircraft Artillery Regiment
 214th Guards Signal Battalion
 54th Guards Reconnaissance Battalion
 151st Guards Combat Engineer Battalion
 108th Maintenance Battalion
 1043rd Combat Service Support Battalion
 112th Medical Battalion
 404th Chemical Battalion

Current Structure 
As of 2017 the brigade's structure is as follows:

 30th Mechanized Brigade, Zviahel
 Headquarters & Headquarters Company
 1st Mechanized Battalion
 2nd Mechanized Battalion
 3rd Mechanized Battalion
 Tank Battalion
 Brigade Artillery Group
 Headquarters & Target Acquisition Battery
 Self-propelled Artillery Battalion (2S3 Akatsiya)
 Self-propelled Artillery Battalion (2S1 Gvozdika)
 Rocket Artillery Battalion (BM-21 Grad)
 Anti-tank Artillery Battalion (MT-12 Rapira)
 Anti-Aircraft Missile Artillery Battalion
 Engineer Battalion
 Maintenance Battalion
 Logistic Battalion
 Reconnaissance Company
 Sniper Company
 Electronic Warfare Company
 Signal Company
 Radar Company
 CBRN-defense Company
 Medical Company

Awards 
The brigade has received 22 orders, and 30 of its soldiers have been decorated with medals.

 Order of the Red Banner - 276th, 325th, 282nd, 855th
 Order of Alexander Nevsky - 54th
 Order of Suvorov - Second Class - 325th, 282nd
 Order of Kutuzov - Second Class - 325th, 282nd, 855th
 Order of Bogdan Khmelnitsky - Second Class - 325th, 282nd
 Order of Kutuzov - Third Class - 54th
 Order of Bogdan Khmelnitsky - Third Class - 54th
 On 7 February 1944, awarded Rivne designation
On October 20, 1999, awarded Novohrad-Volynskyi designation

Past commanders 
Lieutenant General Selivanov September 5, 1941 –
Major-General Petr Ivanovich Zubov
Colonel Yuriy Muchailovich Mukolenko 2006–2007
Colonel Ihor Dovhan 2007–?
Colonel Oleksandr Nesterenko (2011)

References 

Mechanised infantry brigades of Ukraine
Military units and formations established in 2004
Military units and formations awarded the Order of the Red Banner
Military units and formations of Ukraine in the war in Donbas